Acuminiseta is a genus of flies belonging to the family lesser dung flies.

Species
A. cercalis (Richards, 1973)
A. ceropteroides Papp, 2008
A. ciliata (Duda, 1925)
A. elegantula (Duda, 1925)
A. flavicornis (Duda, 1925)
A. longiventris (Duda, 1925)
A. pallidicornis (Villeneuve, 1916)
A. rugarii (Vanschuytbroeck, 1950)

References

Sphaeroceridae
Diptera of Africa
Taxa named by Oswald Duda
Brachycera genera